Sweeney! is a 1977 British action crime drama film and extension of the ITV television series The Sweeney which aired on ITV from 1975 to 1978. The film did well enough at the box office that a sequel, Sweeney 2, was released in cinemas in 1978.

Plot 
Detective Inspector Jack Regan (John Thaw) and Detective Sergeant George Carter (Dennis Waterman) become embroiled in a deadly political scandal. One of the leading members of the British government, Charles Baker (Ian Bannen), is about to secure a huge deal with OPEC (Organisation of the Petroleum Exporting Countries), stabilising the world oil market and boosting Britain's position within it. Baker is a rising star in the government, regarded as a future prime minister, and he is closely controlled by his urbane, manipulative American press secretary, Elliot McQueen (Barry Foster).

That night, Regan is forced to drink alcohol, and completely intoxicated drives his car into a crowded market. The following day, he is suspended from duty for at least two weeks.

When a prostitute (played by Lynda Bellingham) dies in mysterious circumstances, Regan investigates as a favour to one of his informants. He becomes aware that Baker and McQueen might be involved. A spate of killings follow - which sees Regan take on both the criminals and the hierarchy of the Metropolitan Police Service and the British security services.

Ultimately, despite having an injured foot, Regan returns from his suspension and he is reunited with DS Carter.

At Tilbury, East London, Regan and Carter gather around a group of men with Elliot McQueen due to be arrested, but McQueen is shot dead by a sniper riding in a black taxi. DS Carter shouts the final words, "They didn’t kill him; you did!"

Cast
 John Thaw as Detective Inspector Jack Regan
 Dennis Waterman as Detective Sergeant George Carter
 Barry Foster as Elliot McQueen
 Ian Bannen as Charles Baker MP
 Colin Welland as Frank Chadwick
 Diane Keen as Bianca Hamilton
 Michael Coles as Johnson
 Joe Melia as Ronnie Brent
 Brian Glover as Mac
 Lynda Bellingham as Janice Wyatt
 Morris Perry as Flying Squad Commander
 Michael Latimer as P.P.S.
 Johnny Shannon as Scotland Yard Duty Sgt.
 Nadim Sawalha as Chairman of the Oil Producers' Conference

Production
Sweeney! was made by Euston Films, who also produced the television series.

This was the second of three films based on the TV series. The first, Regan, an 80-minute made-for-TV movie which aired on ITV in June 1974, served as the pilot for the TV show, launching the first series off the back of its success.

Euston had been planning a feature film version for some time: this movie was part of a £6 million six-film programme announced two years earlier, in 1975, by Nat Cohen of EMI Films.

Filming was relatively quick and inexpensive, using cast and crew from the series.

The movie was released in 1977, following the conclusion of the show's third season on television, as a money-making big screen outing for what had become an extremely popular series. In the 1970s it was common for television shows to be given cinematic releases, amongst which were some of the biggest box office hits of the decade. Most of these, however, had been comedies - Sweeney! was an attempt to make what the film magazine Sight & Sound described a more "internationally marketed action packed screen adventure."

A number of minor characters in the film had previously appeared in the television series. However, Garfield Morgan, who played Regan's boss, Haskins, in the TV show (but who would be largely absent from the final series on TV the following year) did not appear. As with the television series, a large amount of the filming took place on location (as on all Euston Films productions). The film includes some nudity, and a great deal of graphic violence, which had been impossible to do for a television audience, hence the picture was released in the United Kingdom with an X-certificate rating (over-18's only).

The film echoes the events of the Profumo Scandal which had rocked British politics more than a decade before, although the film has a much more violent premise. It also featured the major international issues of energy policy and oil usage.

Reception
The film was praised for capturing the spirit and setting of the original TV series. It was successful enough for a sequel the following year, Sweeney 2, which saw some of the action set in the Mediterranean.

Announcing the sequel, Barry Spikings of EMI said the first film "was successful, so we're helping fill the demand by making another one".

References

External links 
 
Sweeney! at BFI

1977 crime films
1977 films

British crime films 
1970s English-language films
Films based on television series
Films set in London
EMI Films films
1970s British films